Glafki is a settlement in the Xanthi regional unit of Greece. It is part of the municipal unit of Myki, and is located north northeast of Sminthi and 23 kilometers northeast of Xanthi. In 1991, the population of Glafki was around 1169 inhabitants. In 2001, the population slightly rose to around 1181 inhabitants.

External links
Greek Travel Pages - Glafki

Populated places in Xanthi (regional unit)